Zanabazar Square is a Unicode block containing characters from the Zanabazar Square script (also known as "Horizontal square script"), which is an abugida developed by the monk and scholar Zanabazar (1635–1723) to write Mongolian, Tibetan and Sanskrit.

Block

History
The following Unicode-related documents record the purpose and process of defining specific characters in the Zanabazar Square block:

References 

Unicode blocks
2017 introductions